Ulacia is a surname of Basque origins. Notable people with the surname include:

Guillermo Ulacia, Spanish businessman
Luis Ulacia (born 1963), Cuban baseball player 
Yolexis Ulacia (born 1978), Cuban baseball player

Basque-language surnames